The 1966 Diamond "D" Championship the Canadian women's curling championship was held from February 28 to March 3, 1966 at the Capilano Winter Club in North Vancouver, British Columbia.

Team Alberta, who was skipped by Gail Lee won the event by finishing round robin play unbeaten with a 9–0 record. This was Alberta's first championship. This was also the first time since 1962 in which a rink finished unbeaten and the third time overall.

Alberta also tied a record for most points stolen in one end in their Draw 5 matchup with Quebec as Alberta scored six in the first end en route to a 14-6 win.

This tournament would tie the record set in the inaugural  event for the most extra ends in one tournament with four.

Teams
The teams are listed as follows:

Round robin standings
Final Round Robin standings

Round robin results
All draw times are listed in Pacific Standard Time (UTC−08:00).

Draw 1 
Monday, February 28, 2:30 pm

Draw 2 
Monday, February 28, 8:00 pm

Draw 3 
Tuesday, March 1, 9:00 am

Draw 4 
Tuesday, March 1, 8:00 pm

Draw 5 
Wednesday, March 2, 9:00 am

Draw 6 
Wednesday, March 2, 2:30 pm

Draw 7 
Wednesday, March 2, 8:00 pm

Draw 8 
Thursday, March 3, 9:00 am

Draw 9 
Thursday, March 3, 8:00 pm

References

Diamond D Championship, 1966
Scotties Tournament of Hearts
Sports competitions in Vancouver
Curling in British Columbia
Diamond D Championship
Diamond D Championship
Diamond D Championship
Diamond D Championship
Diamond D Championship
North Vancouver (district municipality)